In probability theory, lumpability is a method for reducing the size of the state space of some continuous-time Markov chains, first published by Kemeny and Snell.

Definition
Suppose that the complete state-space of a Markov chain is divided into disjoint subsets of states, where these subsets are denoted by ti. This forms  a partition  of the states. Both the state-space and the collection of subsets may be either finite or countably infinite.
A continuous-time Markov chain  is lumpable with respect to the partition T if and only if, for any subsets ti and tj in the partition, and for any states n,n’ in subset ti,

 

where q(i,j) is the transition rate from state i to state j. 

Similarly, for a stochastic matrix P, P is a lumpable matrix on a partition T if and only if, for any subsets ti and tj in the partition, and for any states n,n’ in subset ti,

 

where p(i,j) is the probability of moving from state i to state j.

Example

Consider the matrix

 

and notice it is lumpable on the partition t = {(1,2),(3,4)} so we write

 

and call Pt the lumped matrix of P on t.

Successively lumpable processes 

In 2012, Katehakis and Smit discovered the Successively Lumpable processes for which the stationary probabilities can be obtained by successively computing the stationary probabilities of a propitiously constructed sequence of Markov chains. Each of the latter chains has a (typically much) smaller state space and this yields significant computational improvements.  These results have many applications reliability and queueing models and problems.

Quasi–lumpability

Franceschinis and Muntz introduced quasi-lumpability, a property whereby a small change in the rate matrix makes the chain lumpable.

See also

 Nearly completely decomposable Markov chain

References

Markov processes